Julius Eisenecker (21 March 1903 – 12 October 1981) was a German fencer. He won two bronze medals at the 1936 Summer Olympics.

References

1903 births
1981 deaths
German male fencers
Olympic fencers of Germany
Olympic fencers of West Germany
Fencers at the 1936 Summer Olympics
Fencers at the 1952 Summer Olympics
Olympic bronze medalists for Germany
Olympic medalists in fencing
Sportspeople from Frankfurt
Medalists at the 1936 Summer Olympics